Landing Zone Dot was a U.S. Army and Army of the Republic of Vietnam (ARVN) base located south of the Fishhook in Tây Ninh Province southern Vietnam.

History
The base was located approximately 7 km south of the Fishhook in Tây Ninh Province approximately 25 km east of Katum Camp.

On 13 November 1968 the base was defended by the ARVN 36th Regiment supported by Battery D, 1st Battalion, 5th Artillery when it was attacked by a 1000-man People's Army of Vietnam (PAVN) force. The attack was beaten back with support from aerial rocket artillery and artillery at nearby firebases. PAVN losses were 287 killed, while ARVN losses were 4 killed and 23 wounded.

Current use
The base has reverted to farmland.

References

Buildings and structures in Tây Ninh province
Military installations of the United States in South Vietnam